Stanning is a surname which may refer to:
Nick Stanning (born 1971), British target shooter/gunsmith
Heather Stanning (born 1985), British rower
Henry Stanning (1881–1946), English cricketer
John Stanning senior (1877–1929), English cricketer
John Stanning junior (1919–2007), English cricketer

See also